Octávio Merlo Manteca (born 29 December 1993), simply known as Octávio, is a Brazilian professional footballer who plays for Bulgarian club CSKA 1948 as a midfielder.

Club career
Born in Rio de Janeiro, Octávio kicked off his career with Botafogo and made his debut in 2013. In the following season, though he started a match against Resende, he failed to make an impact.

He was loaned out to ABC in 2014 till the end of the year. At the end of the season he returned to his parent club, scoring 4 goals in total 9 appearances for the club.

Italian club Fiorentina took the Brazilian footballer on loan for the 2014–15 season.

He returned to Botafogo side for the Campeonato Brasileiro - Série B. After, he renewed his contract until 2017.

In June 2016, he was loaned out to Tupi Football Club, from Minas Gerais until the end of the season.

Octávio signed a 2-year during contract for Belgian side Beerschot-Wilrijk in the summer of 2017. He left the club in August 2018, and in January 2019, he joined Perilima. Octávio moved to Bulgarian club Beroe on 30 January 2020. After parting ways with Beroe in May 2021, Octávio remained in Bulgaria, signing a one-year contract with newly promoted Lokomotiv Sofia in August 2021.

References

External links
 

1993 births
Living people
Brazilian footballers
Brazilian expatriate footballers
Footballers from Rio de Janeiro (city)
Botafogo de Futebol e Regatas players
ABC Futebol Clube players
ACF Fiorentina players
Tupi Football Club players
K Beerschot VA players
PFC Beroe Stara Zagora players
FC Lokomotiv 1929 Sofia players
FC CSKA 1948 Sofia players
Campeonato Brasileiro Série A players
Campeonato Brasileiro Série B players
First Professional Football League (Bulgaria) players
Expatriate footballers in Italy
Expatriate footballers in Belgium
Expatriate footballers in Bulgaria
Association football midfielders